

Tallest peaks in the UK (including overseas territories)

Counties
See List of English counties by highest point for tops of the metropolitan and non-metropolitan counties, and List of counties of England and Wales in 1964 by highest point for historic county tops.

Hill ranges in England
 Lake District – Scafell Pike at 
 Pennines – Cross Fell, Cumbria, at 
 Cheviot Hills – The Cheviot, Northumberland, at 
 Black Mountains (within England) – Black Mountain, at 
 Peak District – Kinder Scout at 
 Dartmoor – High Willhays at 
 Shropshire Hills – Brown Clee Hill at 
 Exmoor  –  Dunkery Beacon at 
 Malvern Hills – Worcestershire Beacon at 
 North York Moors – Round Hill at 
 Bodmin Moor – Brown Willy at 
 Cotswolds –  Cleeve Hill at 
 Mendip Hills  –  Beacon Batch at 
 Salisbury Plain – Walbury Hill at 
 Greensand Ridge – Leith Hill at 
 South Downs – Butser Hill at 
 North Downs – Botley Hill at 
 Chilterns – Haddington Hill at 
 Yorkshire Wolds – Bishop Wilton Wold at 
 Lincolnshire Wolds – Wolds Top at

London
List of highest points in London

References

Geography of the United Kingdom
 
Highest points